T. K. Nallappan was an Indian politician belonging to Communist Party of India. He was elected as a member of Tamil Nadu Legislative Assembly from  Perundurai in 1980. He died on 26 July 2019 at the age of 87.

References

1930s births
2019 deaths
Communist Party of India politicians from Tamil Nadu
Members of the Tamil Nadu Legislative Assembly